Zhaksykylysh is a salt lake in Aral District, Kyzylorda Region, Kazakhstan.

Table salt is being mined in Zhaksykylysh since 1925. Nowadays the Kyzylorda-based Araltuz company carries out the salt-mining operations. Over 99% of the refined table salt produced in Kazakhstan is extracted at the Zhaksykylysh salt lakes, of which about 66% is exported.

Geography
The Zhaksykylysh Range, a mountain chain of moderate elevation, limits the lake to the northwest. A multitude of smaller lakes and salt flats fan-out to the east in the adjoining flat land. In the same manner as most lakes in the region, Zhaksykylysh is an endorheic lake.

Zhaksykylysh was affected by the drying of the Aral Sea basin in recent decades. Currently the lake surface has shrunk. The lake is shallow and has water only following the melting of the snows in the spring. By July it turns into a dry, salt-covered depression. The basin of the Zhaksykylysh is a grazing ground for local cattle during the spring, before the withering of the grass in the summer.

See also
List of lakes of Kazakhstan

References

External links

Lake Zhaksykylysh. Araltuz. Kyzylorda region, Kazakhstan
Kyzylorda - Information about the region 
 Development of biotechnological processes оf the production of cosmetological preparations based on plant and salt-containing raw materials of Southern Kazakhstan

Lake groups of Kazakhstan
Endorheic lakes of Asia
Kyzylorda Region